"The Fightin' Side of Me" is a song written and performed by American country music artist Merle Haggard and The Strangers.  It was released in January 1970 as the first single and title track from the album The Fightin' Side of Me.  The song became one of the most famous of his career.

In reference to his own 2002 song, "Courtesy of the Red, White, & Blue (The Angry American)," Toby Keith once called this song "the original Angry American song."

Content
Like "Okie from Muskogee," "The Fightin' Side of Me" catered to the conservative working-man's values and politics; Bill Janovitz of Allmusic called the song "patriotic (if not outrightly jingoistic)."

Here, the singer fills the role of a man frustrated with people deriding the country, particularly those who are "harpin' on the wars we fight" and "runnin' down my countrymen," a reference to the then-ongoing Vietnam War. People who do this, claims the singer, are "walkin' on the fightin' side of me" and warns them that "if you don't love it, leave it."

Chart performance and popularity
Like its predecessor "Okie from Muskogee," "The Fightin' Side of Me" immediately broke in popularity when released in January 1970. The song reached No. 1 on the Billboard magazine Hot Country Singles chart, where it remained for three weeks. It also charted in the lower regions of the Billboard Hot 100 chart.

In addition to the studio version of the song, a live version of "The Fightin' Side of Me" was issued as part of Haggard's live album of the same name.

Awards
In 1970, "The Fightin' Side of Me" was nominated for Song of the Year and Single of the Year by the Country Music Association. The song did not win either award, with it losing the Single award to "Okie from Muskogee."

References

Further reading
Collins, Ace. Songs Sung, Red, White, and Blue: The Stories Behind America's Best-Loved Patriotic Songs.  HarperResource, 2003.  

1970 singles
1970 songs
Merle Haggard songs
Songs of the Vietnam War
Songs written by Merle Haggard
Song recordings produced by Ken Nelson (American record producer)
Capitol Records singles